Shawnessy is a CTrain light rail station in Shawnessy, Calgary, Alberta. It serves the South Red Line (Route 201). It is located on the exclusive LRT right of way (adjacent to the CPR ROW), 16 km south of the City Hall interlocking.

It was one of the two new stations to open on June 28, 2004, as part of the South LRT Extension Phase II. The station is located along Shawville Boulevard and is adjacent to its neighbourhood and it's shopping district.

The station's side-loading platforms are staggered with a pedestrian crossing of the tracks between the two platforms. The East platform takes you north through downtown to Tuscany. The West platform takes you the one stop south to the end of the line in Somerset.

The station platforms were originally built to accommodate four-car-length trains.

In 2005, the station registered an average of 3,900 boardings per weekday.

References

CTrain stations
Railway stations in Canada opened in 2004
2004 establishments in Alberta